The following lists events that happened during 2000 in Nigeria.

Incumbents

Federal government
 President: Olusegun Obasanjo (PDP)
 Vice President: Atiku Abubakar (PDP)
 Senate President: Chuba Okadigbo (PDP) (Until 8 August); Anyim Pius Anyim (PDP) (Starting 8 August)
 House Speaker: Ghali Umar Na'Abba (PDP) 
 Chief Justice: Muhammad Lawal Uwais

Governors
 Abia State: Orji Uzor Kalu (PDP)
 Adamawa State: Boni Haruna (PDP)
 Akwa Ibom State: Obong Victor Attah (PDP)
 Anambra State: Chinwoke Mbadinuju (PDP)
 Bauchi State: Adamu Mu'azu (PDP)
 Bayelsa State: Diepreye Alamieyeseigha (PDP)
 Benue State: George Akume (PDP)
 Borno State: Mala Kachalla (APP)
 Cross River State: Donald Duke (PDP)
 Delta State: James Ibori (PDP)
 Ebonyi State: Sam Egwu (PDP)
 Edo State: Lucky Igbinedion (PDP)
 Ekiti State: Niyi Adebayo (AD)
 Enugu State: Chimaroke Nnamani (PDP)
 Gombe State: Abubakar Habu Hashidu (APP)
 Imo State: Achike Udenwa (PDP)
 Jigawa State: Ibrahim Saminu Turaki (APP)
 Kaduna State: Ahmed Makarfi (PDP)
 Kano State: Rabiu Kwankwaso (PDP)
 Katsina State: Umaru Yar'Adua (PDP)
 Kebbi State: Adamu Aliero (APP)
 Kogi State: Abubakar Audu (APP)
 Kwara State: Mohammed Lawal (ANPP)
 Lagos State: Bola Tinubu (AD)
 Nasarawa State: Abdullahi Adamu (PDP)
 Niger State: Abdulkadir Kure (PDP)
 Ogun State: Olusegun Osoba (AD)
 Ondo State: Adebayo Adefarati (AD)
 Osun State: Adebisi Akande (AD)
 Oyo State: Lam Adesina (AD)
 Plateau State: Joshua Dariye (PDP)
 Rivers State: Peter Odili (PDP)
 Sokoto State: Attahiru Bafarawa (APP)
 Taraba State: Jolly Nyame (PDP)
 Yobe State: Bukar Ibrahim (APP)
 Zamfara State: Ahmad Sani Yerima (ANPP)

Events

January
27 January - The government of Zamfara, a predominantly Muslim state, institutes Islamic law. Eleven other states in the north soon follow suit.

May
May - Religious riots erupt in Kaduna over the implementation of Islamic law.

June
5 June - The Obasanjo administration establishes the Niger Delta Development Commission (NDDC) to tackle the human and ecological issues in the Niger Delta region of southern Nigeria.

October
1 October - Nigeria celebrates 40 years of independence from the United Kingdom.

See also
Timeline of Nigerian history

 
Years of the 20th century in Nigeria
2000s in Nigeria
Nigeria
Nigeria